The Chosen Few is a compilation album by English heavy metal band Judas Priest, released on 11 October 2011 by Legacy Recordings label.

Background
The album contains Judas Priest songs selected by other heavy metal and hard rock musicians, and was announced on 12 September 2011, for release on 11 October on Legacy Recordings. The entire album was released via an internet stream on AOL Music on 10 October.

During its first week on sale, the album sold about 1,300 copies in the United States.

Track listing

References

Judas Priest compilation albums
2011 compilation albums